The Gordian Knot is a legendary knot that became a metaphor for an intractable problem solved by a bold stroke.

Gordian Knot may also refer to:
 Gordian Knot (band), an American progressive rock band
 Gordian Knot (album), the debut album of Sean Malone's progressive rock project of the same name
 Gordian Knot motion, a motion in The Standard Code of Parliamentary Procedure to start over
 Gordian Knot Operation, a Portuguese military operation in its overseas province of Mozambique in 1970
 The Gordian Knot (film), a 1911 silent film romantic comedy

See also
 Gordian's Knot, a mechanical puzzle from Thinkfun toys included on the Games 100